Józef Trojak (21 March 1966 - 4 February 2014) was a Polish footballer who played as a defender. 

Trojak debuted as a player in 1983 with Górnik Wałbrzych. The team won the First League that year. He stayed for six years at the club, then transferred to Śląsk Wrocław for a year. At the end of the 1989/1990 season, he returned to Wałbrzych, where he retired at the end of the 1990/1991 season at 35 years of age. He went on to become a coach. 

He died after suffering a heart failure on 4 February 2014 in Grębanin at 47 years of age.

References

1966 births
2014 deaths
Polish footballers
People from Wałbrzych
Śląsk Wrocław players
Górnik Wałbrzych players
Association footballers not categorized by position